Håkan Nordbäck (born 23 February 1969) is a Swedish former cross-country skier who competed from 1994 to 2003. His best World Cup finish was sixth in a 15 km event in the Czech Republic in 2000.

Cross-country skiing results
All results are sourced from the International Ski Federation (FIS).

World Cup

Season standings

Team podiums

 2 podiums – (1 , 1 )

References

External links

1969 births
Living people
Swedish male cross-country skiers
Place of birth missing (living people)